Calle-Calle Bridge is an arch bridge spanning Calle-Calle River, that separates downtown Valdivia from Las Animas a residential area. It allows connection from Valdivia to the airport of Pichoy and to the Pan American Highway.

Bridges in Valdivia
Arch bridges
Bridges in Chile